Tapuruia jolyi is a species of beetle in the family Cerambycidae. It was described by Napp and Martins in 1985.

References

Hexoplonini
Beetles described in 1985